Al-Shabab Sports Club (Youth SC) is an Iraqi football club that is based in Baghdad. It currently plays in the Iraq Division Two. Its home colours are a shirt with blue and black Inter Milan style stripes with black shorts and blue socks and its away colors are a white shirt with blue shoulders and blue on the sides with blue shorts and white socks. In 1980, they won the Stafford Challenge Cup hosted in Bangalore, India, by beating Indian Telephone Industries 4–2 in the final. They won the Stafford Cup again in 1986 and took it back to Iraq, but the cup got destroyed in the Iran–Iraq War. In 1988, they won the Arab Cities Championship under the name of Baghdad City by beating Algiers City 1–0 in the final after extra time thanks to Najih Rahim's 111th-minute goal.

Honours

Domestic

National
Iraq Division One (second tier)
Winners (1): 1977–78
Iraq FA Cup
Runners-up (3): 1982–83, 1983–84, 1989–90

International 
Arab Club Champions Cup
Third place (1): 1988

Friendly 
Stafford Cup
Winners (1): 1980

Famous players 
  Falah Hassan
  Basil Gorgis

References

External links 
 Club profile – les-sports.info

Sport in Baghdad
1951 establishments in Iraq
Football clubs in Baghdad